The Ministry of Agriculture and Forestry of Laos (ກະຊວງ ກະສິກຳ ແລະ ປ່າໄມ້ in Lao language) is a ministry of the government of the Lao People's Democratic Republic (Lao PDR). Its acronym is MAF. The minister of Agriculture and Forestry is Lien Thikeo.

Departments

The ministry of Agriculture and Forestry is divided into several departments.

 Permanent Secretary Office (PSO)
 Department of Livestock and Fisheries (DOLF)
 Department of Agriculture (DOA)
 Department of Forestry (DOF)
 Department of Inspection (DOIN)
 Department of Irrigation (DOI)
 Department of Organization and Personnel (DOAP)
 Department of Planning and Finance (DoPF)
 Department of Policy and Legal Affairs (DoPLA)
 Department of Forestry (DOF)
 Department of Forest Inspection (DOFI)
 Department of Agricultural Extension and Cooperatives (DAEC)
 Department of Agricultural Land Management (DALaM)
 Council for Science and Technology (CST)
 National Agricultural and Forestry Research Institute (NAFRI)

References

External links
Ministry of Agriculture and Forestry (MAF)
Department of Livestock and Fisheries (DLF)
Department of Agriculture (DOA)
Department of Forestry (DOF)
Department of Inspection (DOIN)
Department of Irrigation (DOI)
Department of Organization and Personnel (DOPer)
Department of Planning (DOP)
 Department of agriculture Land Management (DLM)
Council for Science and Technology (CST)

Politics of Laos
Political organizations based in Laos
Laos
Laos
Forestry in Laos
Agriculture in Laos
Agricultural organizations based in Asia